In the United States, state law refers to the law of each separate U.S. state.

The fifty states are separate sovereigns, with their own state constitutions, state governments, and state courts. All states have a legislative branch which enacts state statutes, an executive branch that promulgates state regulations pursuant to statutory authorization, and a judicial branch that applies, interprets, and occasionally overturns both state statutes and regulations, as well as local ordinances. States retain plenary power to make laws covering anything not preempted by the federal Constitution, federal statutes, or international treaties ratified by the federal Senate. Normally, state supreme courts are the final interpreters of state institutions and state law, unless their interpretation itself presents a federal issue, in which case a decision may be appealed to the U.S. Supreme Court by way of a petition for writ of certiorari. State laws have dramatically diverged in the centuries since independence, to the extent that the United States cannot be regarded as one legal system (as to the majority of types of law traditionally under state control), but instead as 50 separate systems of tort law, family law, property law, contract law, criminal law, and so on.

Most cases are litigated in state courts and involve claims and defenses under state laws. In a 2018 report, the National Center for State Courts' Court Statistics Project found that state trial courts received 83.8 million newly filed cases in 2018, which consisted of 44.4 million traffic cases, 17.0 million criminal cases, 16.4 million civil cases, 4.7 million domestic relations cases, and 1.2 million juvenile cases.  In 2018, state appellate courts received 234,000 new cases. By way of comparison, all federal district courts in 2016 together received only about 274,552 new civil cases, 79,787 new criminal cases, and 833,515 bankruptcy cases, while federal appellate courts received 53,649 new cases.

State legal systems by state
 Law of Alabama
 Law of Alaska
 Law of Arizona
 Law of Arkansas
 Law of California
 Law of Colorado
 Law of Connecticut
 Law of Delaware
 Law of Florida
 Law of Georgia
 Law of Hawaii
 Law of Idaho
 Law of Illinois
 Law of Indiana
 Law of Iowa
 Law of Kansas
 Law of Kentucky
 Law of Louisiana
 Law of Maine
 Law of Maryland
 Law of Massachusetts
 Law of Michigan
 Law of Minnesota
 Law of Mississippi
 Law of Missouri
 Law of Montana
 Law of Nebraska
 Law of Nevada
 Law of New Hampshire
 Law of New Jersey
 Law of New Mexico
 Law of New York
 Law of North Carolina
 Law of North Dakota
 Law of Ohio
 Law of Oklahoma
 Law of Oregon
 Law of Pennsylvania
 Law of Rhode Island
 Law of South Carolina
 Law of South Dakota
 Law of Tennessee
 Law of Texas
 Law of Utah
 Law of Vermont
 Law of Virginia
 Law of Washington
 Law of West Virginia
 Law of Wisconsin
 Law of Wyoming

Interstate diversity
The law of most of the states is based on the common law of England; the notable exception is Louisiana, whose civil law is largely based upon French and Spanish law. The passage of time has led to state courts and legislatures expanding, overruling, or modifying the common law; as a result, the laws of any given state invariably differ from the laws of its sister states.  Thus, as noted above, the U.S. must be regarded as 50 separate systems of tort law, family law, property law, contract law, criminal law, and so on.  (In addition, the District of Columbia and the federal territories also have their own separate legal systems analogous to state legal systems, although they do not enjoy state sovereignty.)

A typical example of the diversity of contemporary state law is the legal test for finding a duty of care, the first element required to proceed with a lawsuit for negligence (the basis for most personal injury lawsuits). A 2011 article found that 43 states use a multifactor balancing test usually consisting of four to eight factors, but there are 23 various incarnations because so few states use exactly the same test, and consolidating those into a single list results in 42 unique factors.  Naturally, the laws of different states frequently come into conflict with each other, which has given rise to a huge body of law regulating the conflict of laws in the United States. As of the mid-2010s, American federal and state courts were deciding around 5,000 conflict-of-laws cases each year—far more than in any other country or even any other continent. 

The diversity of U.S. state law first became a notable problem during the late 19th-century era known as the Gilded Age, when interstate commerce was nurtured by then-novel technologies like the telegraph, the telephone, the steamship, and the railroad.  Many lawyers during the Gilded Age complained about how the diversity and volume of state law hampered interstate trade and introduced complexity and inconvenience into virtually any interstate transaction (commercial or otherwise).  This widespread frustration was evident at the founding of the American Bar Association in 1878; one of the ABA's original founding purposes was to promote "uniformity of legislation throughout the Union." There have been three major reactions to this problem, none of which were completely successful: codification, uniform acts, and the Restatements.

Codification

The United States, with the exception of Louisiana, originally inherited a common law system in which the law was not organized and restated such that it could be identified as (1) relevant to a particular legal question and (2) currently in force. The process of organizing the law, called codification, was borrowed from the civil law through the efforts of American lawyer David Dudley Field. Field, in turn, was building upon early (but wholly unsuccessful) foundational work by the English legal philosopher Jeremy Bentham, who actually coined the verb "to codify" for the process of drafting a legal code. The earliest attempt at codification occurred in Massachusetts with a 1648 publication.

Naturally, there is much diversity in the structure of the state codes, reflecting the diversity of the statutory law on which they were built.  New York's codes are known as "Laws." California and Texas simply call them "Codes."  Other states use terms such as "Code of [state name]", "Revised Statutes", or "Compiled Statutes" for their compilations.  California, New York, and Texas use separate subject-specific codes; Maryland's code has, as of 2016, been completely recodified from numbered articles into named articles; virtually all other states and the federal government use a single code divided into numbered titles or other top-level divisions.  Louisiana is a unique hybrid in that it has five subject-specific codes and a set of Revised Statutes for everything else.  A poorly drafted 1864 anti-corruption amendment to Pennsylvania's constitution prevented its legislature from starting comprehensive codification until 1970 (after the state constitution was finally amended to add the necessary exception in 1967).

The advantage of codification is that once the state legislature becomes accustomed to writing new laws as amendments to an existing code, the code will usually reflect democratic sentiment as to what the current law is (though the entire state of the law must always be ascertained by reviewing case law to determine how judges have interpreted a particular codified statute).

In contrast, in jurisdictions with uncodified statutes, like the United Kingdom, determining what the law is can be a more difficult process. One has to trace back to the earliest relevant Act of Parliament, and then identify all later Acts which either amended the earlier Act or expressly or impliedly repealed it. For example, when the UK decided to create a Supreme Court of the United Kingdom, lawmakers had to identify every single Act referring to the House of Lords that was still good law, and then amend all of those laws to refer to the Supreme Court.

In most U.S. states, certain areas of the law, especially the law of contracts and torts, continue to exist primarily in the form of case law, subject only to limited statutory modifications and refinements.  Thus, for example, there is no statute in most states which one can consult for answers on basic issues like the essential elements of a contract.  Rather, one must consult case law, with all the complexity and difficulty that implies.

Major exceptions include the states of California, Montana, North Dakota, and South Dakota as well as the territory of Guam, all of which largely enacted Field's proposed civil code even though it was repeatedly rejected and never enacted by his home state of New York.  Idaho partially enacted the contract portions of Field's civil code but omitted the tort sections. Georgia initiated its own full codification independent of Field, which resulted in the enactment of the oldest ancestor of the modern Official Code of Georgia Annotated in 1861.  As Field belatedly conceded in an 1889 article, Georgia's code was enacted before his civil code, but he was unaware of the Georgia codification project because of the breakdown in interstate communications that preceded the American Civil War. 

In some states, codification is often treated as a mere restatement of the common law, to the extent that the subject matter of the particular statute at issue was covered by some judge-made principle at common law.  California is notorious for a confused approach to the interpretation and application of codified statutes: "California judges wandered between expansive construction and traditional strict construction, lingering at every point in between—sometimes all in the course of the same opinion." In other states, there is a tradition of strict adherence to the plain text of the codes.

Uniform acts

Efforts by various organizations to create uniform acts have been only partially successful. The two leading organizations are the American Law Institute (ALI) and the Uniform Law Commission (ULC), formerly known as the National Conference of Commissioners on Uniform State Laws (NCCUSL).

Uniform acts are proposed by private organizations like ULC to cover areas of law traditionally governed by the states where it would be useful to have a consistent set of rules across the various states.  
The most successful and influential uniform acts are the Uniform Commercial Code (a joint ALI-ULC project) and the Model Penal Code (from ALI).

However, uniform acts can only become the law of a state if they are actually enacted by the state legislature. Many uniform acts have never been taken up by state legislatures, or were successfully enacted in only a handful of states, thereby limiting their usefulness.

Restatements

Upon its founding in 1923, ALI promptly launched its most ambitious and well-known enterprise: the creation of Restatements of the Law which are widely used by lawyers and judges throughout the United States to simplify the task of identifying and summarizing the current status of the common law.  Instead of listing long, tedious citations of old cases that may not fit very well together (in order to invoke the long-established principles supposedly contained in those cases), or citing a treatise which may reflect the view of only one or two authors, they can simply cite a Restatement section (which is supposed to reflect the consensus of the American legal community) to refer to a particular common law principle.

The Restatements are often followed by state courts on issues of first impression in a particular state because they correctly state the current trend followed by most states on that issue.  However, the Restatements are merely persuasive authority.  This means that state courts (especially at the appellate level) can and have deviated from Restatement positions on a variety of issues.

Civil law issues

Much of Louisiana law is derived from French and Spanish civil law, which stems from its history as a colony of both France and Spain. Puerto Rico, a former Spanish colony, is also a civil law jurisdiction of the United States.  However, the criminal law of both jurisdictions has been necessarily modified by common law influences and the supremacy of the federal Constitution.

Furthermore, Puerto Rico is also unique in that it is the only U.S. jurisdiction in which the everyday working language of court proceedings, statutes, regulations, and case law is Spanish. All states, the federal government, and most territories use American English as their working language. Some states, such as California, do provide certain court forms in other languages (Chinese, Korean, Spanish, Vietnamese) for the convenience of immigrants and naturalized citizens. But American law as developed through statutes, regulations, and case law is always in English, attorneys are expected to take and pass the bar examination in English, judges hear oral argument, supervise trials, and issue orders from the bench in English, and testimony and documents originating in other languages are translated into English before being incorporated into the official record of a case.

Many states in the southwest that were originally Mexican territory have inherited several unique features from the civil law that governed when they were part of Mexico. These states include  Arizona, California, Nevada, New Mexico, and Texas.  For example, these states all have a community property system for the property of married persons (Idaho, Washington, and Wisconsin have also adopted community property systems, but they did not inherit them from a previous civil law system that governed the state). Another example of civil law influence in these states can be seen in the California Civil Code, where the law of contracts is treated as part of the law of obligations.

Many of the western states, including California, Colorado, New Mexico, Texas, and Wyoming use a system of allocating water rights known as the prior appropriation doctrine, which is derived from Spanish civil law. Each state has modified the doctrine to suit its own internal conditions and needs.

See also
List of U.S. state legal codes
Uniform Act
State constitution (United States)
State legislature (United States)

References